Austrepollen is a village in the Mauranger area of Kvinnherad municipality in Vestland county, Norway. The western end of the Folgefonna Tunnel is located in Austrepollen, taking it from an isolated rural village before the opening of the tunnel, to a village along a main regional highway. The village of Nordrepollen and the Jondal Tunnel are located just a short distance to the northwest. The Mauranger power station is also located in the village.

References

Villages in Vestland
Kvinnherad